Grinnell Island is an island  long, lying south of Chappel Island in the Donovan Islands of Antarctica. It was first mapped from air photos taken by U.S. Navy Operation Highjump, 1946–47, and was named by Carl R. Eklund for Lieutenant Sheldon W. Grinnell of the U.S. Navy Reserve Medical Corps, a medical officer at Wilkes Station, 1957.

See also 
 List of antarctic and sub-antarctic islands

References

Islands of Wilkes Land